Private Collection is the third album released by Jon and Vangelis, released in May 1983 on Polydor Records.

Track listing
All tracks composed by Jon Anderson and Vangelis
"Italian Song" (2:53)
"And When the Night Comes" (4:35)
"Deborah" (4:54)
"Polonaise" (5:24)
"He Is Sailing" (6:49)
"Horizon" (22:53)

Personnel 
Jon Anderson - vocals
Vangelis - keyboards, synthesisers, programming
with:
Dick Morrissey - saxophone on "And When the Night Comes"

Credits 
Music composed by Vangelis
Lyrics written by Jon Anderson
Arranged and produced by Vangelis

Charts

References

External links
 

1983 albums
Jon and Vangelis albums
Polydor Records albums